This is a list of notable Zimbabweans. This list includes people born in Zimbabwe, notably of Zimbabwean descent, or otherwise strongly associated to Zimbabwe.

Academics 
 Gordon Chavunduka (19312013), sociologist and traditional healer, Vice Chancellor of the University of Zimbabwe
 Tonderai Kasu, medical doctor and Substantive Director of Health and Environmental Services for Chitungwiza
 Joseph Landsberg (born 1938), forestry scientist, author, science administrator and consultant, awarded 2020 Marcus Wallenberg Prize
 Fadzayi Mahere (born 1985), lawyer and critic of the government, independent candidate in Zimbabwean general election, 2018
 Mufti Ismail ibn Musa Menk (born 1975), Muslim cleric (Ulama), Islamic proselytiser, entertainer

Artists
 Coster Balakasi (born 1972), pp 
 Dominic Benhura (born 1968), sculptor
 Richard Chiwasa (born 1947), sculptor
 Pfungwa Dziike (born 1972), sculptor
 Charles Fernando (19411995), artist
 Bronson Gengezha (born 1981), sculptor
 Tawanda Kanhema (born 1981/1982), technologist, photographer
 Onias Mupumha, sculptor
 Thakor Patel, painter 
 Anthony Sabuneti (born 1974), sculptor 
 Ronika Tandi (born 1975), sculptor
 Brian Watyoka, sculptor

Businesspeople
 John Bredenkamp (born 1940), founder of the Casalee Group
 Phillip Chiyangwa (born 1959), founder of the Affirmative Action Group; chair of Native Africa Investments Ltd
 David Hatendi (19532012), former CEO of MBCA Bank Ltd and NMB Bank Ltd, founder of Hatendi Private Equity Advisers
 Strive Masiyiwa (born 1961), founder of telecommunications firm Econet Wireless and Botswana's Mascom Wireless 
 Mutumwa Mawere (born 1960), multi-industrialist
 Paul Tangi Mhova Mkondo (19452013), insurance guru, property magnate
 Trevor Ncube (born 1962), newspaper owner
 Divine Ndhlukula, founder of SECURICO
 Prag Lalloo Naran (19261981), multi-industrialist

Military personnel 
Happyton Bonyongwe (born 1960), retired major general of the Zimbabwe National Army
Dumiso Dabengwa (19392019), former head of Zimbabwe People's Revolutionary Army (ZIPRA) intelligence
Azim Daudpota (19332017), Pakistani commander of the Air Force of Zimbabwe
Ken Flower (died 1987), head of the Central Intelligence Organisation
Ambrose Gunda (died 2007), former brigadier general
Chenjerai Hunzvi (19492001), chairman of the Zimbabwe National Liberation War Veterans Association
Alfred Nikita Mangena (19431978), commander of ZIPRA
Elson Moyo, former deputy commander of the Air Force of Zimbabwe and key figure in the 2017 Zimbabwean coup d'état
Solomon Mujuru (19452011), commander of the Zimbabwe National Army
Perrance Shiri (19552020), retired Air Chief Marshal of the Air Force of Zimbabwe
Jabulani Sibanda, former ZIPRA soldier, president of the Zimbabwe National Liberation War Veterans Association
Josiah Tongogara (19381979), commander of Zimbabwe African National Liberation Army (ZANLA)
Vitalis Zvinavashe (19432009), first commander of the Zimbabwe Defence Forces

Musicians

Politicians

Sportspeople

Cricketers 
Scott Adamson (19061962), former cricketer for Rhodesia
Derek Carle (born 1973), cricketer
Shane Cloete (born 1971), cricketer
Duncan Fletcher (born 1948), former national cricket captain and former England cricket team coach
Andy Flower (born 1968), retired cricketer and captain of the Zimbabwe national cricket team
Robin Gifford (born 1974), former cricketer
Dave Hallack (born 1966), cricketer
Pommie Mbangwa (born 1976), retired cricketer, professional sports commentator
Waddington Mwayenga (born 1984), cricketer
Henry Olonga (born 1976), retired professional cricketer
Ray Price (born 1976), retired professional cricketer
Bradley Robinson (born 1975), retired professional cricketer
Heath Streak (born 1974), retired professional cricketer, head coach of the Zimbabwe national cricket team
Darren Weber (born 1972), retired professional cricketer

Footballers 
Cleopas Dube (born 1990), forward
Bruce Grobbelaar (born 1957), retired professional footballer
Justice Majabvi (born 1984), professional footballer 
Clement Matawu (born 1982), midfielder
Robson Muchichwa (born 1975), retired professional footballer
Peter Muduhwa (born 1993), professional footballer
Benjani Mwaruwari (born 1978), retired professional footballer
Ndabenkulu Ncube (born 1988), professional footballer
Peter Ndlovu (born 1973), retired professional footballer
Tinashe Nengomasha (born 1982), professional footballer
Esrom Nyandoro (born 1980), professional footballer
Simbarashe Sithole, forward
Conrad Whitby (born 1984), midfielder

Others 
Byron Black (born 1969), retired professional tennis player
Derek Chisora (born 1983), professional heavyweight boxer, (active).
Cara Black (born 1979), professional tennis player
Wayne Black (born 1973), retired professional tennis player
Warren Carne (born 1975), cross country mountain cyclist
Tendai Chimusasa (born 1971), retired long distance runner
Kirsty Coventry (born 1983), Olympic swimming medallist and former world record holder
Brendon de Jonge (born 1980), professional golfer on the PGA Tour
Tendai Mtawarira (born 1985), professional rugby union player
David Pocock (born 1988), Zimbabwe-born Australian rugby player
Nick Price (born 1957), professional golfer and World Golf Hall of Fame inductee
Vitalis Takawira (born 1972), retired professional footballer
Micheen Thornycroft (born 1987), Olympic rower
Kevin Ullyett (born 1972), retired professional tennis player

Writers 
 M. K. Asante (born circa 1982), Zimbabwe-born American author of Buck: A Memoir
 Catherine Buckle (born 1957), author of children's books shush autobiographical non-fiction
 NoViolet Bulawayo (born 1981), author of We Need New Names, shortlisted for the Man Booker Prize
 Jacob Chikuhwa (born 1940) 
 Brian Chikwava (born 1972), writer and musician
 Shimmer Chinodya (born 1957), novelist
 Judy Croome (born 1958), writer
 Tsitsi Dangarembga (born 1959), author and filmmaker
 John Eppel (born 1947), writer
 Petina Gappah (born 1971), writer and lawyer
 Peter Godwin (born 1957), author, journalist, and documentary filmmaker
 Chenjerai Hove (19562015), writer 
 Wiseman Magwa (born 1962), playwright
 Morgan Mahanya (born 1948), writer
 Onesimo Makani Kabweza (19391993), journalist and magazine editor
 J. Nozipo Maraire (born 1966), writer, entrepreneur, and doctor
 Dambudzo Marechera (19521987), actor
 Alexander McCall Smith (born 1948), Zimbabwe-born British author of The No. 1 Ladies' Detective Agency series
 Cont Mhlanga, playwright and theatre director 
 Charles Mungoshi (19472019), writer
 Charles Mungoshi (19472019), writer
 Togara Muzanenhamo (born 1975), poet
 Angus Shaw (born 1949), journalist
 George Shire, scholar, political analyst, and cultural critic
 Wilbur Smith (19332021), author of historical fiction
 Yvonne Vera (19642005), writer

Others 
 Chido Govera (born 1986), campaigner for sustainable farming
 Robert Martin Gumbura, former pastor and convicted criminal
 Mavis Moyo, Radio Zimbabwe (ZBC Radio 4) broadcaster

References